Transcription factor AP-2 gamma also known as AP2-gamma is a protein that in humans is encoded by the TFAP2C  gene. AP2-gamma is a member of the activating protein 2 family of  transcription factors.

Transcription factor AP-2 gamma is involved in early development, specifically morphogenesis - the formation of shape. AP2-gamma can regulate gene transcription by interacting with viral and cellular enhancing components and binding to the sequence 5'-GCCNNNGGC-3’. AP2-gamma activates genes that are important for placenta development and retinoic acid-mediated differentiation of the eyes, face, body wall, limbs, and neural tube. AP2-gamma also suppresses genes such as MYC and C/EBP alpha. It also represses CD44 expression, which is a cell marker for some breast and prostate cancers. Mutations of this transcription factor can lead to poorly developed placenta and tissues. A mutated AP2-gamma gene is known to cause branchiooculofacial syndrome (BOFS), which is a disease characterized by face and neck abnormalities, such as cleft lip or anophthalmia – lack of eyeballs, that have developed prior to birth. Complete knockout of the TAP2C gene that encoded AP-2 gamma leads to placenta malformation and embryonic/fetal death.

References

Auman, H. J., T. Nottoli, O. Lakiza, Q. Winger, S. Donaldson, and T. Williams. "Transcription Factor AP-2gamma Is Essential in the Extra-embryonic Lineages for Early	Postimplantation Development." National Center for Biotechnology Information. U.S. National Library of Medicine, June 2002. Web. 15 Apr. 2014.

Bogachek, M. V., and R. J. Weigel. "TFAP2C (transcription Factor AP-2 Gamma (activating Enhancer Binding Protein 2 Gamma))." TFAP2C (transcription Factor AP-2 Gamma(activating Enhancer Binding Protein 2 Gamma)). Oct. 2013. Web. 15 Apr. 2014.

"Branchio-oculo-facial Syndrome." Genetics Home Reference. U.S. National Library of Medicine, 7 Apr. 2014. Web. 15 Apr. 2014.

"Genes and Mapped Phenotypes." National Center for Biotechnology Information. U.S. National Library of Medicine, 12 Apr. 2014. Web. 15 Apr. 2014.

"Transcription Factor AP-2 Gamma - TFAP2C - Homo sapiens (Human)." Transcription Factor AP-2 Gamma - TFAP2C - Homo sapiens (Human). UniProtKB, 19 Mar. 2014. Web. 15 Apr. 2014.

Further reading

External links
 
 

Transcription factors